Piscinola, or Piscinola-Marianella, is a northern suburb of Naples, Italy, with a population of ca. 20,000. It is bordered to the north by the Scampia district, north-west with the municipality of Mugnano of Naples, on the west by the Chiaiano district, to the south with the district of San Carlo all'Arena and east with the district Miano.

With the Marianella neighborhood and adjacent neighborhoods Chiaiano and Scampia, Piscinola constitutes, since 2005, the 8th municipality of Naples.

Piscinola also belongs to the group of the suppressed municipalities, in fact for self-government in 1866, following the annexation to the City of Naples. With Marianella was linked administratively, from annexation to the City of Naples, as the ward.

History
Until 1865 it was an autonomous municipality merged in Naples.

The northern branch of Line 1 of Naples Metro connects, from 1995, the area to the center of Naples, a facility that has somewhat alleviated the otherwise lack of municipal infrastructure.

Infrastructure and transport

Railways
Piscinola is connected to Aversa Centro, through the railroad Naples-Giugliano-Aversa, also called "rainbow line", managed by the Ente Autonomo Volturno, opened in 2005 to replace an old station along the railway Alifana active between 1913 and 1975.

Urban mobility
Piscinola is served by the bus in local and long distance public service, operated respectively by ANM and CTP and by Piscinola-Scampia stop, 1 Line terminal station, allowing and interchange with the railway Naples-Giugliano-Aversa.

Between 1926 and 1960 the town was connected with the center from the line 2 tram systems Capodimonte.

Monuments and places of interest

Cultural heritage
Church of the Santissimo Salvatore
Church of Arciconfraternita Estaurita of Santissimo Sacramento
Churches of the Madonna delle Grazie, S. M. del Soccorso and S. Maria della Pietà (called St. Vincent)
Various archaeological finds
Various palaces
Palaces "At court," and "estates" in the local agricultural style
Ancient center adjacent to the street SS. Salvatore
Vico operai (historic building founded by the farmers of the Scampia lands)
Public garden "Mario Musella"
Municipal library "Don D. Severino"

Historic Piscinola center
Although greatly altered in the period after the earthquake, the historic center of Piscinola still retains many interesting architectural relics of the past. The "island" which is defined by way of the Salvatore, Napoli Street and Miano street, is the oldest part, whose plant is perhaps coeval with the foundation of the church of SS. Salvatore, i.e. around the year 950. Surely the buildings rise in the area were made, to replace the previous artifacts, in later ages, between the 16th and 18th centuries.

Social solidarity
Which has become a symbol of redemption for the "Villa Nestor 'district is the main pole of social welfare activities Piscinola managed by the municipal administration in partnership with the Rotary Club and the Italian Red Cross. The structure can count on a large construction of premises: gym, ballroom, an auditorium, a senior center, a cooking workshop and the door to immigrants. In consultation with the school district 44 and the Territorial Unit of Base 48 they have also been initiated for integration testing, e.g. l '"garden villa" entrusted to a mixed group of children and the elderly, the "Newspaper of the Villa", curated by the "invisible Doors", which documents the local activities and the "Game Room".

Quartieri of Naples
Former municipalities of the Province of Naples